Gangnan is a district of Guigang, Guangxi, People's Republic of China, covering part of the southern portion of the city.

Administrative divisions
There is 1 subdistrict, 6 towns and 2 townships in the district:

The only subdistrict is Jiangnan Subdistrict (江南街道).

Towns:
Qiaoxu (桥圩镇), Muge (木格镇),  (木梓镇), Zhanjiang (湛江镇), Dongjin (东津镇), Batang (八塘镇)

Townships:
Xintang Township (新塘乡), Watang Township (瓦塘乡)

References

External links

County-level divisions of Guangxi
Guigang